Jean Agostinho da Silva (born 1 June 1988), commonly known as Jean Carioca, is a Brazilian professional  footballer who plays as a attacking midfielder for KF Feronikeli.

Career
Jean Carioca was born in Duque de Caxias, Rio de Janeiro.

He left Tigres do Brasil and Brazil for only the second time in his professional career to join Albanian Superliga side FK Kukësi ahead of the Europa League first qualifying round. He made his FK Kukësi and European debut on 2 July 2015 against Belarusian side FC Torpedo-BelAZ Zhodino in the first qualifying round of the Europa League, where he played the full 90 minutes and scored in the 9th minute of the 2–0 win.

In the 2015–16, he was the Number 10 player for Kukësi and he also established himself as a regular starter for the club. During the season, he only scored three league goals in 34 league appearances, along with a goal in the Albanian Cup Final against Laçi at the Qemal Stafa Stadium were his team won 5–3 on penalties after the final finished 1–1 through 120 minutes.

References

External links
Jean Carioca at ZeroZero

1988 births
Living people
Brazilian footballers
Association football midfielders
Esporte Clube Tigres do Brasil players
Clube de Regatas Brasil players
ABC Futebol Clube players
Tombense Futebol Clube players
Botafogo de Futebol e Regatas players
Associação Atlética Ponte Preta players
Figueirense FC players
Xanthi F.C. players
Esporte Clube XV de Novembro (Piracicaba) players
Centro Sportivo Alagoano players
Treze Futebol Clube players
FK Kukësi players
União Recreativa dos Trabalhadores players
KF Feronikeli players
Super League Greece players
Kategoria Superiore players
Football Superleague of Kosovo players
Campeonato Brasileiro Série B players
Campeonato Brasileiro Série C players
Campeonato Brasileiro Série D players
Brazilian expatriate footballers
Brazilian expatriate sportspeople in Greece
Brazilian expatriate sportspeople in Portugal
Brazilian expatriate sportspeople in Albania
Brazilian expatriate sportspeople in Kosovo
Expatriate footballers in Greece
Expatriate footballers in Portugal
Expatriate footballers in Albania
Expatriate footballers in Kosovo
People from Duque de Caxias, Rio de Janeiro
Sportspeople from Rio de Janeiro (state)